Hermès is a surname of Provençal origin.

Etymology 
Derived from the Old Provencal erm meaning "a desert"/"a wasteland" + the locative suffix -ès meaning "associated with"/"pertinent to"/"inhabitant of", the topographic surname Hermès indicates that the original bearer lived in relative isolation upon, or was otherwise associated with, an area of barren or uncultivated land. 

People with the surname Hermes include:

Ad Hermes (1929–2002), Dutch (CDA) politician
Andreas Hermes (1878–1964), German politician, minister in several Weimar Republic governments and member of the anti-Nazi resistance
Carli Hermès (born 1963), Dutch photographer and commercial director
Georg Hermes (1775–1831), German Roman Catholic philosopher and theologian
Gertrude Hermes (1901–1983), English wood engraver, printmaker and sculptor
Hans Hermes (1912–2003), German mathematician
Heriberto Hermes (1932–2018), American Roman Catholic bishop
Johann Gustav Hermes (1846–1912), German mathematician
Peter Hermes (1922–2015), West German Ambassador to the United States from 1979 to 1984, son of Andreas 
Thierry Hermès (1801-1878), French founder in 1837 of the French luxury design house Hermès
Will Hermes (born 1960), American author, broadcaster, journalist and critic